Bethesda Chapel may refer to:
 Bethesda Chapel, Abercwmboi, Rhondda Cynon Taf, Wales
 Bethesda Chapel, Dublin, Ireland
 Bethesda Methodist Chapel, Hanley, Staffordshire, England
 Bethesda Chapel, Merthyr Tydfil, Wales

See also 
 Bethesda Church (disambiguation)